Doris Blanc (7 November 1926 – 2010) was a Swiss figure skater. She competed in the ladies' singles event at the 1948 Winter Olympics.

References

External links
 

1926 births
2010 deaths
Swiss female single skaters
Olympic figure skaters of Switzerland
Figure skaters at the 1948 Winter Olympics
Place of birth missing